ICDT may refer to:

 International Centre for Democratic Transition, a non-profit organization about democratic transition
 International Conference on Database Theory, an annual research conference on database theory